Cabera variolaria, known generally as the vestal or pink-striped willow spanworm, is a species of geometrid moth in the family Geometridae. It is found in North America.

The MONA or Hodges number for Cabera variolaria is 6678.

References

Further reading

 

Caberini
Articles created by Qbugbot
Moths described in 1858